Thond-angi or Tond-angi is a village and a Mandal in Kakinada district in the state of Andhra Pradesh in India.

Geography
It has an average elevation of 11 meters (39 feet).

References 

Villages in Kakinada district